Anluan Mac Aodhagáin, Irish poet, fl. 1200–1600.

Anluan was a member of the Mac Aodhagáin clan, who were professional bards, poets and lawyers in medieval Ireland. His exact lifetime is uncertain, and he appears to be known only from a single surviving forty-eight line poem attributed to him, Bréagach sin a bhean.

External links
 http://www.ucc.ie/celt/published/G402027/index.html
 http://www.irishtimes.com/ancestor/surname/index.cfm?fuseaction=Go.&UserID=

Medieval Irish poets
Year of death unknown
Year of birth unknown
Irish male poets